The Explorers Club is an American-based international multidisciplinary professional society with the goal of promoting scientific exploration and field study. The club was founded in New York City in 1904, and has served as a meeting point for explorers and scientists worldwide.

The Explorers Club hosts an annual dinner to honor accomplishments in exploration, which is known for its adventurous, exotic cuisine.

History
In 1904, a group of men active in exploration met at the request of noted journalist, historian, and explorer Henry Collins Walsh, to form an organization to unite explorers in the bonds of good fellowship and to promote the work of exploration by every means in its power. Joining Walsh were Adolphus Greely, Donaldson Smith, Carl Lumholtz, Marshall Saville, Frederick Dellenbaugh, and David Brainard. After several further informal meetings, The Explorers Club was incorporated on October 25, 1905. Women were first admitted in 1981, with a class including Sylvia Earle and Kathryn Sullivan. Famous honorary members have included Theodore Roosevelt, John Glenn, Jim Fowler, Walter Cronkite, Prince Philip Duke of Edinburgh, Sir Edmund Hillary, Buzz Aldrin and Albert I Prince of Monaco.

The Explorers Club has 32 chapters in the United States and around the world, which serve as local contact points for explorers, scientists, and students. Many chapters hold monthly dinners, lectures and seminars, award field-research grants to students, publish newsletters and organize expeditions, field trips and educational events.

Charter members
David Legge Brainard (1856–1946): U.S. Army Lieutenant-Colonel: Sioux, Bannock, and Nez Perce Campaigns; Survivor, Lady Franklin Bay Expedition (1881–1884); in 1882 claimed Farthest North at 83º24’30” North latitude
Frank Chapman (1864–1945): Curator of Birds and Mammals, American Museum of Natural History
Frederick Cook (1865–1940): Surgeon and ethnologist to the first Peary Expedition to Greenland (1892); leader of the SS Miranda Expedition (1894); surgeon on the Belgica Expedition (1897–1898), the first ship to winter over in the Antarctic; founding member of the American Alpine Club (1902)
Herschel Clifford Parker (1867–1931: Professor of Physics, Columbia University; mountaineer; author; founding member of the American Alpine Club (1902)
Marshall Howard Saville (1867–1935): Professor of American Archaeology, Columbia University; Curator of Archaeology, American Museum of Natural History
Henry Collins Walsh (1863–1927): Journalist; historian; explorer of Central America and Greenland; founding member of Arctic Club of America (1894); nominal "Founder" of The Explorers Club (1904)
Caspar Whitney (1862–1929): War correspondent, explorer of North and South America, outdoorsman, sports journalist, member of the International Olympic Committee (1900–1905), author; Editor, Outing magazine.

Famous firsts
The Explorers Club is renowned for various "Famous Firsts" accomplished by its members, including:
First to the North Pole (1909) – Robert E. Peary (honorary membership in 1912)  & Matthew Henson
First to the South Pole (1911) – Roald Amundsen, honorary membership in 1912
First to the summit of Mt. Everest (1953) – Sir Edmund Hillary & Tenzing Norgay, elected honorary members 1953
First to the deepest point in the ocean (1960) – Don Walsh (honorary member 1997) & Jacques Piccard
First to the surface of the Moon (1969) – Neil Armstrong & Buzz Aldrin (honorary member 2018)
First to both poles, space, and the deepest ocean (2021) – Richard Garriott

Headquarters

The Explorers Club held its first regular meeting at its original headquarters in the Studio Building at 23 West 67th Street in New York City. The club finished construction on its next headquarters at 544 Cathedral Parkway in 1928 and there the club continued to expand its extensive collection of artifacts, trophies and books on exploration. In 1965, spurred by Lowell Thomas, the club purchased its current headquarters on the Upper East Side, a six-story Jacobean revival mansion on East 70th Street, where it houses the James B. Ford Exploration Library, the Sir Edmund Hillary Map Room and a collection of artifacts from more than a century of exploration. The building was previously the home of Stephen C. Clark. Certain designated rooms of the Club are open to the general public.

Lectures and publications
In the 1920s, the club began to invite both explorers returning from the field and visiting scientists to relate their experiences and findings. By the 1930s these informal gatherings developed into academic lectures and illustrated talks. The club continues to provide weekly lectures and programs, which are often open to the public at its headquarters. In November 1921, The Explorers Club published the first edition of The Explorers Journal to share news from the field, remarks from headquarters, recent acquisitions, obituaries, and book reviews. The Explorers Journal is still published quarterly, with articles and photography from Explorers Club members in the field.

Television series 

In 2022, The Explorers Club and Discovery Channel made a partnership to produce a series called Tales from The Explorers Club, which is hosted by Explorers Club member Josh Gates. The series covered stories about other famous Explorers Club members such as Ernest Shackleton, Sir Edmund Hillary, Gertrude Bell, Jim Lovell, and Jeff Bezos.

The Explorers Club flag

To obtain permission to carry the flag, a club member must show that an expedition holds the promise of scientific results. Once approved, the flag must be exhibited at every suitable opportunity on the expedition, and must be returned to the club along with a written record of the expedition — the Flag Report. The club's research collections is the repository for these unique reports, including the original "Flag Book" — a bound journal of hand-written reports, vintage prints, clippings and assorted records submitted by the explorers who first carried The Explorers Club flag on expeditions.

Today there are 202 numbered flags. These include flags carried on such expeditions as:
Flag #2 – Roy Chapman Andrews – the Gobi Desert expeditions
Flag #7 – Sir George Hubert Wilkins – the first trans-Arctic flights
Flag #32 – Capt. Robert A. "Bob" Bartlett – the Effie M. Morrissey expeditions
Flag #50 – Bertrand Piccard and André Borschberg – Solar Impulse across America
Flag #61 – Luc Hardy – the Pax Arctica expedition (Canadian Arctic)
Flag #71 – Raphaël Domjan – PlanetSolar the first around the world with solar energy 
Flag #80 – Tim Taylor FN’04, Citation of Merit Laureate 2008 — Discovery of three lost US WWII submarines: Expedition R-12, Expedition S-26, Expedition S-28
Flag #81 – Victor Vescovo and Patrick Lahey – the Five Deeps expedition
Flag #105 – L. Ron Hubbard – The Alaska Radio Experimental Expedition 
Flag #123 – Thor Heyerdahl – the Kon-Tiki expedition
Flag #132 – David Concannon for Jeff Bezos and Bezos Expeditions – the Saturn V F-1 engine search and recovery expedition
Flag# 134 – Gino Caspari – Discovery of Royal Scythian Tomb Tunnug 1
Flag #150 – George Kourounis – collecting soil samples from the Darvaza gas crater
Flag #161 – James Cameron – the Deepsea Challenger expedition
Flag #163 – L. Ron Hubbard – The Oceanographic-Archeological Expedition (1961) and the Hubbard Geological Survey Expedition (1966) 
Flag #193 – Naomi Uemura – first solo North Pole expedition
NASA missions Apollo 8, Apollo 11, Apollo 13 and Apollo 15 each carried miniature club flags on board.

Honors and grants

Honors
The Explorers Club Medal, the highest honor that can be bestowed by the Club, is awarded for extraordinary contributions directly in the field of exploration, scientific research, or to the welfare of humanity. Past recipients include:

1914 – Robert E. Peary
1917 – William Curtis Farabee
1918 – Vilhjalmur Stefansson
1919 – Cândido Mariano da Silva Rondon
1923 – Adolphus Greely
1925 – Lowell H. Smith
1926 – Knud Rasmussen
1927 – Roald Amundsen, Robert Bartlett & Fridtjof Nansen
1937 – Richard E. Byrd
1954 – Auguste Piccard
1961 – President Herbert Hoover
1964 – Gilbert H. Grosvenor
1968 – Lowell Thomas
1971 – Neil Armstrong, Edwin “Buzz” Aldrin Jr., & Michael Collins for NASA
1979 – Thor Heyerdahl
1980 – Willard Bascom
1983 – Sir Ranulph Fiennes
1986 – Sir Edmund Hillary
1989 – Mary Leakey
1993 – Jane Goodall
1995 – Robert Ballard
1996 – Sylvia Earle
2001 – Joe Kittinger
2005 – Burt Rutan, Brian Binnie and Mike Melvill for SpaceShipOne
2008  – Eugenie Clark
2009 – E. O. Wilson
2013 – James Cameron
2014 – Walter Munk
2015 – Neil deGrasse Tyson
2016 – E. Frederick Roots
2019 – Kenneth Lacovara
2020 – Victor Vescovo

Beyond The Explorers Club Medal, the club also presents, among others, The Lowell Thomas Award, The Sweeney Medal, a Citation of Merit, The Buzz Aldrin Space Exploration Award and The Tenzing Norgay Award.

Grants
The club also awards a range of grants for field science and exploration, including The Youth Activity Fund Grant, The Exploration Fund Grant, and the Presidents Award for Exploration and Technology. One club award, the Scott Pearlman Field Award for Science and Exploration, is named for one of the youngest club members (inducted at age 22) who was a photographer and participant in three flag expeditions. Scott Pearlman contracted hepatitis C and died at the age of 38. Pearlman was a son of Explorers Club member & officer Robert E. Pearlman.

Presidents
Presidents of the Explorers Club are elected by a vote of the Board of Directors after the Annual Meeting. Men and women may offer their name for consideration.

References

External links
 

Organizations established in 1904
Organizations based in New York (state)
Clubs and societies in New York City
1904 establishments in New York City